Friday Elahor (born 14 November 1967) is a Nigerian former footballer who played at both professional and international levels as a midfielder.

Career
Elahor played club football in Nigeria, Denmark, Ivory Coast and India for Bendel Insurance, ACB Lagos, Iwuanyanwu Nationale, Brøndby, Africa Sports, Nigerdock Lagos, FC Kochin and Mohun Bagan.

He also earned 14 caps for the Nigerian national team between 1990 and 1993, and participated at the 1990 African Cup of Nations.

References

1967 births
Living people
Nigerian footballers
Nigeria international footballers
Bendel Insurance F.C. players
Heartland F.C. players
Brøndby IF players
Africa Sports d'Abidjan players
FC Kochin players
Mohun Bagan AC players
Nigerian expatriate footballers
Nigerian expatriate sportspeople in India
Expatriate men's footballers in Denmark
Expatriate footballers in Ivory Coast
Expatriate footballers in India
ACB Lagos F.C. players
Association football midfielders